Crystal Bog is a domed bog in the town of Crystal in Aroostook County, Maine. It "supports one of Maine’s most diverse fens and a large number of rare plants and animals". It was declared one of Maine's National Natural Landmarks in 1973.

References

Protected areas of Aroostook County, Maine
Landforms of Aroostook County, Maine
Bogs of the United States
Wetlands of Maine
National Natural Landmarks in Maine